Melvin E. Walker (born April 27, 1914, died November 9, 2000 in Strongsville, Ohio) was an American track and field athlete specializing in high jump.  He was the co-national champion with Dave Albritton in 1938.  He finished a non-qualifying fourth place in the 1936 Olympic Trials.  That year, while representing Ohio State University, he had tied with his Ohio State teammate Albritton for the NCAA Championship.  On August 12, 1937, he set the world record for high jump in Malmö, clearing . The record would stand until June 17, 1941 when it was beaten by Lester Steers.

Walker benefitted from a rule change that had previously outlawed diving, or clearing the bar first with his head.  Walker used a variation of the Western roll.

External links

References

1914 births
2000 deaths
American male high jumpers
World record setters in athletics (track and field)